Kunkush (Ancash Quechua for Puya raimondii, hispanicized spelling Cuncush) is a mountain in the Andes of Peru, about  high. It is located in the Lima Region, Oyón Province, Oyón District.

References

Mountains of Peru
Mountains of Lima Region